The Polish–Swedish War (1600–1629) was twice interrupted by periods of truce and thus can be divided into:

 Polish–Swedish War (1600–1611)
 Polish–Swedish War (1617–18)
 Polish–Swedish War (1621–1625)
 Polish–Swedish War (1626–1629)

17th-century conflicts
Wars involving the Polish–Lithuanian Commonwealth
Wars involving Sweden
Poland–Sweden relations
Lithuania–Sweden relations
Warfare of the Early Modern period
17th century in Sweden
1600s in the Polish–Lithuanian Commonwealth
1610s in the Polish–Lithuanian Commonwealth
1620s in the Polish–Lithuanian Commonwealth
Wars of succession involving the states and peoples of Europe

Polish-Swedish war